Jerrold H. Levy is an American critical care physician and cardiac anesthesiologist  at Duke University Medical Center who currently serves as the Co-Director of Duke's Cardiothoracic Intensive Care Unit. He is most noted for his research in surgical hemostasis, coagulopathy in the critically ill, shock, anaphylaxis, and developing purified and recombinant therapeutic approaches to treat bleeding.  He has authored over 400 publications, including scientific manuscripts, review articles, editorials, books, and book chapters. His research manuscripts are available on PubMed. Additionally, he has authored a number of websites aimed at providing medical information to healthcare professionals through his website, DocMD.

He has been an active member on several national committees through his involvement in the American Heart Association, International Society of Thrombosis and Haemostasis (ISTH), and American Society of Anesthesiologists. He has served on the board of directors for the Society of Cardiovascular Anesthesiologists, and is currently on the board of directors for the Foundation for the Advancement of Cardiothoracic Surgical Care. He currently is an Executive Editor at Anesthesiology and serves as Co-Chair for the ISTH Scientific and Standardization Committee on Perioperative Thrombosis and Hemostasis.

Training and education
Jerrold Levy's original career goal was to become a research scientist. He worked in a biochemistry lab as an undergraduate when his mentor recommended that he pursue a career in medicine. He went on to complete medical school at University of Miami, completed an internship in Internal Medicine at Jackson Memorial Hospital, and trained in Anesthesiology  at the Massachusetts General Hospital. Following residency, he sub-specialized in Cardiothoracic Anesthesiology and Critical Care Medicine at the Massachusetts General Hospital.

Emory University
Dr. Levy served as Deputy Chair for Research and Director of Cardiothoracic Anesthesiology at Emory where he also had a coagulation research laboratory.  During his time at Emory, he also served on the Blood Transfusion Committee, the Human Investigations Committee, the Research Committee, and the Clinical Investigator's Advisory Council. He was actively involved in medical education and career development, serving on the Medical Student Education Committee, the Residency Evaluation Committee, and the Faculty Workshop Development Committee.

Duke University
In 2013, Dr. Levy began working at Duke with dual appointments as Professor of Anesthesiology and Associate Professor of Surgery in 2013. In addition to his role as the Co-Director of the cardiothoracic surgical intensive care unit, he also serves on the Transfusion Committee, Senior Research Council, and Cardiac Safety Research Consortium.

Honors and awards 
 1969– Harvard Prize Book Award
 1970 - American Legion Award
 1970 - Order of the Silver Knight, Miami Herald
 1970 - Florida Reagent Scholar
 1973 - Elsa U. Pardee Student Research Fellowship, University of Michigan
 1974 - James A Angel Scholar, University of Michigan
 1975 - American Cancer Society Student Research Fellowship
 1981 - M. Jasinska Anesthesia Award, Massachusetts General Hospitals
 1985 - 3M New Investigator Award
 2007 - Fellowship of the American Heart Association
 2013 - Fellowship of the Society of Critical Care Medicine

Weblink 
Song: Anaphylactic Shock Therapy by Jerrold Levy

References

American anesthesiologists
University of Michigan alumni
Leonard M. Miller School of Medicine alumni
Emory University faculty
Duke University faculty
Physicians from Florida
Year of birth missing (living people)
Living people